Dhogs is an independent Galician film in the Galician language directed by Andrés Goteira (Meira, 1983), which was released in 2017. This was the director's debut film, and starred Carlos Blanco Vila, Antonio Durán "Morris", Miguel de Lira, Melania Cruz, Iván Marcos and María Costas. It premiered at the Buenos Aires International Festival of Independent Cinema (BAFICI) on April 19, 2017, and was nominated for the Best Feature Film in the Avant-Garde and Genre section. This is the first film shot in Galicia to premiere at the Sitges Film Festival, on October 9, 2017. In Galicia, the premiere took place at the Ourense International Film Festival on October 21, 2017.

Plot 
The film connects 6 parallel stories that revolve around different characters: a beautiful woman, a man with a dark life, a taxi driver and an old ex-military man.

Production 
The film was funded by AGADIC and the Provincial Council of Lugo, but also a part of the budget of the film was obtained through the Verkami platform, with more than 400 patrons. The film was shot in several locations in Galicia, such as Viveiro, As Pontes de García Rodríguez, Oleiros and A Coruña, as well as in the desert of Tabernas, in Almería.

Awards and nominations

Mestre Mateo Awards 2017 
Dhogs won thirteen awards, including best film, best director, best screenplay, best actor, best actress, best supporting actor and best supporting actress, becoming the most awarded film in the history of the awards. It was nominated for 17 awards in 14 categories.

References

External links 
 Official page 
 

2017 films
Galician-language films
Spanish comedy-drama films
Spanish crime films
2017 directorial debut films